Pavlo Myahkov (born 30 December 1992) is a professional Ukrainian football midfielder.

Career
Myahkov is a product of the youth team systems of FC Melitopol. After playing for the Ukrainian Second League club SC Olkom Melitopol, he signed a contract with FC Zorya in February 2011.

He was called up to play for the Ukraine national under-21 football team by trainer Pavlo Yakovenko to the Commonwealth Cup in 2012.

References

External links
 
 
 

1992 births
Living people
People from Melitopol
Sportspeople from Zaporizhzhia Oblast
Ukrainian footballers
Association football midfielders
Ukrainian expatriate footballers
Expatriate footballers in Belarus
Expatriate footballers in Poland
FC Zorya Luhansk players
SC Olkom Melitopol players
FC Oleksandriya players
FC Minsk players
NK Veres Rivne players
Ruch Chorzów players
FC Metalurh Zaporizhzhia players
FC Kremin Kremenchuk players
FC Kramatorsk players
Ukrainian Premier League players
Ukrainian expatriate sportspeople in Belarus
Ukrainian expatriate sportspeople in Poland